Jamaal Malik Williams (born April 3, 1995) is an American football running back for the New Orleans Saints of the National Football League (NFL). He played college football at BYU and was drafted by the Green Bay Packers in the fourth round of the 2017 NFL Draft.

Early years
Williams attended Summit High School in Fontana, California. While there, he played high school football for the Sky Hawks. A 3-star recruit, he committed to Brigham Young University (BYU) to play college football over an offer from Boise State.

College career
Williams played at BYU from 2012 to 2016.

2012 season
On August 30, 2012, Williams made his collegiate debut with 15 rushing yards in the win over Washington State. On September 15, against Utah, he had his first collegiate rushing touchdown. On September 28, against Hawaii, he had 155 rushing yards and two rushing touchdowns. On October 13, against Oregon State, he added two more rushing touchdowns. On October 27, against Georgia Tech, he had 107 rushing yards, three rushing touchdowns, and three receptions for 54 yards and a touchdown. On November 10, against Idaho, he had 104 rushing yards and two rushing touchdowns. Overall, he finished the 2012 season with 775 rushing yards, 12 rushing touchdowns, 27 receptions, 315 receiving yards, and one receiving touchdown.

2013 season
On August 31, 2013, in the season opener against Virginia, Williams had 144 rushing yards and 25 receiving yards. In the next game against Texas, he had 182 rushing yards in the victory. On October 25, against Boise State, he had 107 rushing yards and 24 receiving yards. On November 16, against the Idaho State Bengals, he had 131 rushing yards and three rushing touchdowns. On November 30, against Nevada, he had 219 rushing yards and a rushing touchdown. Overall, in the 2013 season, he finished with 1,233 rushing yards, seven rushing touchdowns, 18 receptions, and 125 receiving yards.

2014 season
On September 6, 2014, against Texas, Williams had 89 rushing yards and twelve receiving yards in the victory. Five days later, against Houston, he had 139 rushing yards and two rushing touchdowns. On October 3, against Utah State, he had 102 rushing yards. He later suffered a knee injury and was sidelined for the remainder of the 2014 season. In his shortened season, he had 518 rushing yards, four rushing touchdowns, eight receptions, and 47 receiving yards.

2015 season
Williams did not play in 2015 after withdrawing from the school, and redshirted.

2016 season
Williams started his final collegiate season with 163 rushing yards against Arizona. On September 24, against West Virginia, he had 169 rushing yards and two rushing touchdowns. On September 30, he rushed for a school-record 286 yards and five touchdowns on 29 carries during a 55–53 win over Toledo. In the next game, against Michigan State, he had 163 rushing yards and two rushing touchdowns. In his final college game, he was named the MVP of the 2016 Poinsettia Bowl after rushing for 210 yards and a touchdown against Wyoming. That red-shirt senior season, he had 1,375 yards on 234 carries for 12 touchdowns, leading the independent conference in all three categories. During his career, he rushed for a school-record 3,901 yards on 726 carries with 35 touchdowns.

Statistics

Professional career

Green Bay Packers
Williams was drafted by the Green Bay Packers in the fourth round with the 134th overall pick in the 2017 NFL Draft. He was the 13th running back selected in that year's draft. He was signed to his rookie contract on June 1, 2017.

On September 10, 2017, in his NFL debut, Williams had two rushes for nine yards in a 17–9 victory over the Seattle Seahawks. In Week 9, against the Detroit Lions, he scored his first career rushing touchdown. On December 3, against the Tampa Bay Buccaneers, he had 113 rushing yards and a rushing touchdown. Overall, he finished his rookie season with 556 rushing yards, four rushing touchdowns, 25 receptions, 262 receiving yards, and two receiving touchdowns.

In the 2018 season, Williams recorded 464 rushing yards, three rushing touchdowns, and 27 receptions for 210 receiving yards.

During a Week 4 loss to the Philadelphia Eagles on September 26, 2019, Williams suffered a concussion during an illegal helmet-to-helmet hit by Eagles defensive end Derek Barnett. Williams lay motionless on the turf for several minutes before medical staff wheeled him off the field on a gurney; he was immediately transported to a local hospital for evaluation, but was released from the hospital the next day. In the following week's game against the Detroit Lions, Williams rushed 14 times for 104 yards and caught four passes for 32 yards and a touchdown in the 23–22 win. In Week 8 against the Kansas City Chiefs, Williams rushed seven times for 22 yards and a touchdown and caught three passes for 14 yards and a touchdown in the 31–24 win. Overall, he recorded 460 rushing yards and one rushing touchdown to go along with 39 receptions for 253 receiving yards and five receiving touchdowns.

Williams was placed on the reserve/COVID-19 list by the team on November 3, 2020, and activated six days later. Williams finished the 2020 season with 119 carries for 505 rushing yards and four rushing touchdowns to go along with 31 receptions for 236 receiving yards and one receiving touchdown.

Detroit Lions
On March 19, 2021, Williams signed a two-year contract with the Detroit Lions. In the Lions' 2021 regular season opener, he had 110 scrimmage yards in the 41–33 loss to the San Francisco 49ers. On November 25, 2021, Williams carried the ball for the 585th time in his career, breaking the NFL record previously held by Phillip Lindsay for the most carries without ever fumbling. Williams finished the 2021 season with 153 carries for 601 rushing yards and three rushing touchdowns to go along with 26 receptions for 157 receiving yards.

In the Lions' first four games to start the 2022 season, Williams recorded two rushing touchdowns in three of the games. With two rushing touchdowns in the final game of the regular season, Williams set the Lions' single-season touchdown record with 17, surpassing the previous record of 16 set by Barry Sanders in 1991. He finished the year with career-highs in yards (1,066), touchdowns (17) and carries (262) while playing in all 17 games for the Lions.

New Orleans Saints
On March 17, 2023, Williams signed a three-year contract with the New Orleans Saints.

Personal life
Williams has a daughter named Kalea. He is a self-described "nerd" for anime, video games, and cosplay. He particularly prefers One Punch Man, Dragon Ball Z, and Naruto. After a game on January 1, 2023, Williams wore a Naruto headband and shirt while giving interviews to reporters, and said that he wanted to go home to play Pokémon Scarlet. During the Sunday Night Football game against the Packers on January 8, 2023, Williams wore a different Naruto headband and introduced himself as "First Swagg Kazekage, leader of the hidden village of the den", a reference to the anime, drawing immediate reactions on social media.

NFL career statistics

Regular season

Postseason

Awards and records

NFL awards
 2x FedEx Ground Player of the Week – Week 11, 2022 Week 17, 2022

Lions franchise records
 Most rushing touchdowns in a single season: 17
 Most rushing touchdowns in the first 10 games of the regular season: 12 (November 20, 2022)

References

External links

Detroit Lions bio
BYU Cougars bio 

1995 births
Living people
American football running backs
BYU Cougars football players
Detroit Lions players
Green Bay Packers players
New Orleans Saints players
People from Fontana, California
Players of American football from California
Sportspeople from Rialto, California